Aadithyan (birth name Titus; 9 April 1954 – 5 December 2017) was an Indian film score and soundtrack composer. He has predominantly scored music for Tamil films apart from working in Telugu and Malayalam films. He sang several songs for his own films and for other composers. He created and released many Tamil Pop & Remix albums in India and Malaysia.

He also hosted his own television cooking show 'Aadithyan's Kitchen' on Jaya TV for 8 years. He was a self-taught artist and his paintings adorn walls of several homes. He died at the age of 63 in Hyderabad on 5 December 2017.

Career
Having started his career as sound designer, he made his debut as composer with Amaran (1992) with songs like "Vethala Potta" and "Chandirane Suriyane" becoming chartbusters. He went on to work in over 30 films including Maman Magal, Luckyman, Asuran, Sevaalaperi Paandi, Kovilpatti Veeralakshmi among others. Lyricist Piraisoodan in an interview with B. H. Abdul Hameed revealed that he suggested the name 'Adithyan' when he entered the film music.

Filmography
As composer

As singer

References

1954 births
2017 deaths
Tamil film score composers
Telugu film score composers
Malayalam film score composers
People from Thanjavur
Deaths from kidney disease